The Pleading in English Act 1362 (36 Edw. III c. 15), often rendered Statute of Pleading, was an Act of the Parliament of England. The Act complained that because the Norman French language was largely unknown to the common people of England, they had no knowledge of what was being said for or against them in the courts, which used Law French. The Act therefore stipulated that "all Pleas which shall be pleaded in [any] Courts whatsoever, before any of his Justices whatsoever, or in his other Places, or before any of His other Ministers whatsoever, or in the Courts and Places of any other Lords whatsoever within the Realm, shall be pleaded, shewed, defended, answered, debated, and judged in the English language, and that they be entered and inrolled in Latin".

Historical context 

Prior to the Norman conquest of England in 1066, traditional common law in England had been discussed in the vernacular since time immemorial, and had been written in the Germanic vernacular (Old English) since c. 600 with the Anglo-Saxons and beginning with the law code of Æthelberht of Kent. Following the Norman conquest, the language of the latest conquerors was used Anglo-Norman French, which developed into Law French, was used for pleadings, and Latin was used in writing. The fourteenth century saw a decline in Law French, hence the Pleading in English Act, which marked the beginning of modern Legal English.

Some 50 years later, English became the language of official government in the form of Chancery Standard during the reign of Henry V (1413 to 1422).

The statute was repealed by the Statute Law Revision Act 1863 and the Statute Law (Ireland) Revision Act 1872.

See also
Ordinance of Villers-Cotterêts, 1539, French legislation mandating use of French in law, in place of Latin
Sachsenspiegel, c. 1220, first legal document written in German rather than Latin
Proceedings in Courts of Justice Act 1730
Legal English
Law French

References

Acts of the Parliament of England
Language policy in the United Kingdom
1360s in law
1362 in England